Antispila chlorosema is a moth of the family Heliozelidae. It was described by Edward Meyrick in 1931. It is found in Chile.

References

Moths described in 1931
Heliozelidae
Endemic fauna of Chile